Donevan Chew is a  creative director for an advertising firm based in Malaysia. He won a Clio Award in 2012 for the Pictionary print ad called T-rex.

Career
Chew has worked at Grey Worldwide, Leo Burnett and Ogilvy.  He has worked on global and local brands, including GlaxoSmithKline, Nestle, Unilever, Pizza Hut, Maxis, and Malaysia Airlines.  In his career of fifteen years he has won advertising awards from the Cannes International Advertising Awards, the Clio Awards, the One Show, D&AD, Spikes Asia, and the ADFEST. He also has acted as a jury member in the local advertising award show since 2012, and was part of the Grand Jury of the New York Festivals 2014.

References

Living people
Advertising directors
Year of birth missing (living people)